Many parts of Northern regions of the Indian subcontinent were ruled as sovereign or princely states by various clans consisting of Jats.

Empires and Kingdoms

 Kingdom of Bharatpur
 Sikh Empire
 Kingdom of Kaikan
 Kingdom of Gohad

Princely states

Rajasthan
Bharatpur State (Sinsinwar Jats)
Dholpur State (Deshwal Jats)
 Jangladesh

Madhya Pradesh
Gohad State (Bamraulia Jats)
Gwalior State (Bamraulia Jats)

Uttar Pradesh
Hathras (Thenua Jats)
Mursan (Thenua Jats)

Punjab
Patiala State (Sidhu Jats)
Nabha State (Sidhu Jats)
Faridkot State (Brar Jats)

Haryana
Jind State (Sidhu Jats)
Ballabgarh State (Tewatia Jats)
Kalsia   (Sandhu Jats)

Misls
Phulkian Misl (Sidhu Jats)
Kanhaiya Misl (Sandhu Jats)
Nakai Misl (Sandhu Jats)
Shaheedan Misl (Sandhu Jats)
Singhpuria Misl (Virk Jats)
Bhangi Misl (Dhillon Jats)
Singh Krora Misl  (Virk & Dhaliwal Jats)
Nishanwalia Misl (Gill Jats)
Sukerchakia Misl (Sandhawalia Jats)

Jat chieftaincies

Uttar Pradesh
Sasni (Thenua Jats)
Sahanpur (Kakran Jats)
Kuchesar (Dalal Jats)
Unchagaon (Pilania Jats)
Maulaheri (Pawar Jats)

Rajasthan
Weir   (Sinsinwar Jats)
Sidhmukh (Kaswan Jats)
Sheikhsar (Godara Jats)
Sui (Sihag Jats)
Sogar (Sogarwar Jats)

Punjab
Malaudh (Sidhu Jats)
Bhadaur (Sidhu Jats)
Alawalpur (Bains Jats)
Rupnagar (Virk Jats)
Sialkot (Sial Jats)

Haryana
Kaithal (Sidhu Jats)
Buria (Sandhu Jats)
Ladwa (Sandhwalia Jats)

Madhya Pradesh
Pichhore (Donderiya Jats)
Bhitarwar (Hanselia Jats)

Gujarat
Varahi (Malek Jats)
Bajana (Malek Jats)

Sindh
Kaikan (Kekan Jats)
Sisam (Budhiya Jats)

Balochistan
Makran (Makad Jats)

See also 
 Jat people
 List of Jat people

References

Further reading

External links
Princely States of India A-J at WorldStatesmen
Princely States of India K-Z at WorldStatesmen

Jat princely states
Hindu dynasties
Jat clans
Jat rulers